The year 2002 is the 1st year in the history of the Universal Reality Combat Championship, a mixed martial arts promotion based in the Philippines. In 2002 the URCC held 1 event, URCC 1: Mayhem in Manila.

Events list

URCC 1: Mayhem in Manila

URCC 1: Mayhem in Manila was an event held on November 23, 2002 at the Casino Filipino in Parañaque, Metro Manila, Philippines.

Results

See also
 Universal Reality Combat Championship

References

Universal Reality Combat Championship events
2002 in mixed martial arts